Yengiabad (also Romanized as Yengīābād; also known as Yengābād) is a village in Shivanat Rural District, Afshar District, Khodabandeh County, Zanjan Province, Iran. At the 2006 census, its population was 117, in 26 families.

References 

Populated places in Khodabandeh County